The Catholic Association of the UK, abbreviated to the CA, has been around in one form or another since 1881 and ran its first pilgrimage to Lourdes in 1901. Its objects are set out in the Memorandum and Articles but its main purpose is to mastermind the CA Annual Pilgrimage to Lourdes, currently incorporating the diocesan pilgrimages of Clifton Diocese, East Anglia Diocese, Northampton Diocese, Portsmouth Diocese, Southwark Archdiocese, and the Stonyhurst College Lourdes Pilgrimage and British Province of the Carmelites Pilgrimage. Each of these groups is overseen by a Diocesan Director. The entire Pilgrimage is coordinated by the Pilgrimage Director and the Pilgrimage Management Committee, and takes place at the end of August.

The CA is a registered charity.

History
The Catholic Association was founded in 1891, with the approval and blessing of Cardinal Manning. Its original objects are stated in its Rules as being;

It was particularly successful in the organization of pilgrimages to Rome and other places of Catholic interest.

The first pilgrimage to Lourdes took place in September 1901 and became the forerunner of what nowadays is known as the CA Annual.

The Second World War brought the activities of the Association to a halt. However, in 1947 the organisation of pilgrimage resumed with the first to Lourdes in that year. The Catholic Association was responsible for organising the HCPT pilgrimage at Easter until that pilgrimage separated to make its own arrangements. A similar situation arose when the pilgrimage of the burgeoning diocese of Arundel and Brighton was removed from the Catholic Association by the Bishop, Michael Bowen. That Diocese now has a very successful pilgrimage to Lourdes in July each year.

In the 1970s, it ceased trading as a travel agent and registered as a charity. The sole purpose of the charity is to mastermind the Pilgrimage.

A list of previous officials is available on their website.

How the Pilgrimage works

The CA is a 'Company Limited by Guarantee and not having a Share Capital.' It is also a Registered Charity (number 1071120). The Catholic Association is a company and the Directors are registered as such, although the Directors refer to themselves as Trustees.

Catholic Association Trust
The Trustees fulfill the usual role of Trustees, which is to guard the funds.

The Trustees appoint Pilgrimage Officers (the heads of the different service sections including doctors, nurses, brancardiers, handmaids, youth group etc.). The Pilgrimage Officers, together with the Diocesan Directors, make up the Pilgrimage Management Committee (PMC). Trustees are permitted to attend meetings of the PMC but, apart from two or three who have specific functions there, it is generally thought that the PMC should be allowed to manage itself. There is some overlap of membership and responsibilities between the Trustees, the PMC, and the Hospitalité Council.

The trustees (as of 07-11-2018):

Rev Paul Hendricks - Chairman

Dr Nuala Mellows - Medical 

Dr Steve Gill - Financial & Assurance

Dr Sadie Vile - Operations

Mr. Chris Buller - Travel

Mrs. Theresa Mahon - Nursing

Mgr Rev Vincent Harvey - Spirituality

Mr. Chris Thorpe - Chief Executive & Appointments

Pilgrimage Management Committee
The Trustees appoint Pilgrimage Officers (the heads of the different service sections including doctors, nurses, handmaids, youth group, etc.). The Pilgrimage Officers, together with the Diocesan Directors, make up the Pilgrimage Management Committee (PMC). Trustees are permitted to attend meetings of the PMC but, apart from two or three who have specific functions there, the PMC should be allowed to manage itself. There is some overlap of membership and responsibilities between the Trustees, the PMC, and the Hospitalité Council. The PMC is responsible for the actual organisation and practicalities of the annual Lourdes pilgrimage.

As of December 2014, the membership of the PMC consists of:

 Rt Rev Paul Hendricks, (Auxiliary Bishop of Southwark) (Chairman)
 Mgr Bill Saunders (Pilgrimage Director)
 Steve Gill (Treasurer)
 Sadie Vile (Secretary)
 Heads of Service (Currently, Richard Hargreaves, Lina Al Araj, Nuala Mellows and Theresa Mahon).
 Chris Buller (President Hospitalité)
 David Ball (Young Helpers' Group Leader)
 Fr Antony Lester, O Carm (Chaplain to the Sick & Hospitalité)
 Catherine Christmas (Director of Music)
 Rev Philip Glandfield (CA Master of Ceremonies)
 Simon Gallop or Nicole Gallop Mildon (HCP)
 A Director or Co-ordinator from each of the Diocesan and other participating groups (Stonyhurst College, Glanfield Children's Group & British Province of Carmelites)

Catholic Association Hospitalité
The Catholic Association Hospitalité of Our Lady of Lourdes – CA Hospitalité for short – exists to bind together the volunteer pilgrims, known in French as Hospitalier(e)s, who help in the service of all pilgrims – especially 'sick pilgrims' – during the Pilgrimage: doctors, nurses, handmaids (female helpers), brancardiers (male helpers), chaplains, and praying members. The Hospitalité is a religious sodality in the Catholic Church, with a strong social and spiritual element and it is affiliated to the Hospitalité Notre Dame de Lourdes (the central Hospitalité coordinating most volunteers in Lourdes throughout the year).

The CA Hospitalité is governed by a Council consisting of some ex officio members who are Pilgrimage Officers (on the Pilgrimage Management Committee), and three members elected each for three years on a 'rolling' programme. The Council elects its own Officers, the President has a seat on the PMC, and the Council has power to co-opt members for a specific purpose. The Council is the driving force of the Hospitalité and looks after everything connected to the Sick Pilgrims.

The principal aims and objects of the CA Hospitalité are set out in the Constitution (and summarised above the application for membership) as follows:

a. To serve sick pilgrims going to Lourdes on the Catholic Association Pilgrimage and to help in the smooth running of religious and other activities involving sick pilgrims on that Pilgrimage under the direction of and in collaboration with the Pilgrimage Directors and Heads of Service.

b. To strengthen the bonds of fraternal life between its members and to help them maintain their obligations as Christians, their responsibilities in the Church and their devotion to Our Lady. This service consists especially of looking after the material needs of the sick pilgrims although the obligation of a member of the Hospitalité is not limited to material work. Members will be expected to help all pilgrims to benefit fully from the religious and social benefits of a pilgrimage to Lourdes.

Volunteer pilgrims may apply for membership of the Hospitalité on conclusion of their first pilgrimage. The Hospitalité Council may admit to the membership any class of person or individual who, in their opinion, renders suitable services to the sick. Following approval by the Hospitalité Council, applicants will be admitted to ordinary membership during their next pilgrimage to Lourdes, having made an Act of Consecration before the Patron or Chaplain. After working with the Pilgrimage for a further two years as members, helpers may apply for admission to full membership of the Hospitalité the following year. The Hospitalité Council may also invite 'Sick Pilgrims' to become full members of the Hospitalité who support the organization through their prayers.

It is worth remembering that members are encouraged to take the Spirit of Lourdes home with them and to promote the pilgrimage, in particular by recruiting other volunteers and by making known the facilities provided for Sick Pilgrims, both those who need to stay in an Accueil (house of welcome for the sick) and others who would be better served in a hotel.

As of October 2018 the CA Hospitalité Council consists of:

•	Bishop Peter Doyle, Northampton (Patron)

•	Anne Hoskins (President)

•	Chris Talbot (Secretary)

•	John Hirwe (Treasurer)

•	Fr Nicholas King SJ (Chaplain)

•	Richard Hargreaves (Chief Brancardier)

•	Lina Al-Araj (Chief Handmaid)

•	Dr Nuala Mellows (Chief Medical Officer)

•	Tina Quin (Chief Nurse)

•	John Toryusen (Leaders of the Young Helper’s Group)

•	John Wynne-Jones (Youth Representative)

•	Elected members: Christopher Page, Micaёla Corcoran & James Silsbury

•	Cliona Devereaux (Safeguarding Officer)

The CA Hospitalité is also affiliated to the Association of British Lourdes Pilgrimage Hospitalités.

UK Hospitalité Events
Each year the Catholic Association holds an AGM for all members.
Every two years the Catholic Association runs a retreat at Walsingham.

Volunteering
The CA relies on volunteer helpers to work with the various assisted pilgrims (sick) who come to Lourdes each year. The CA divides their volunteers up into services (with a Head of Service for each of these):

 Brancardiers (male non medical helpers). The Chief Brancardier is their Head of Service.
 Handmaids (female non medical helpers). The Chief Handmaid is their Head of Service.
 Nurses. The Chief Nurse is their Head of Service.
 Doctors. The Chief Medical Officer is their Head of Service.

Each service works in teams to look after the assisted pilgrims in the Accueil and in hotels. The brancs and handmaids are in mixed teams; and the two heads of service work together in various areas of assisted pilgrim care.

Helpers Children's Programme (HCP)
The CA also organises their Helpers' Children's Programme (HCP), which offers a programme of activities for any helpers with children working on the Pilgrimage. HCP is open over various periods of the day.

Music Group
The CA also searches for volunteers to be part of their music group, which plays at all the services and events during the Pilgrimage. The group look for singers and those who can play musical instruments. Volunteers must always bring their own instruments.

Pilgrimage main events
Whilst small details will change from year to year, like most of the large-scale pilgrimages to Lourdes, the Catholic Association pilgrimage includes certain recurring events:

 Pilgrimage Candle
 Opening Mass
 Prayer on the Prairie
 Opening Party
 Mass at the Grotto (normally on the Monday morning)
 Blessed Sacrament Procession
 Marian Torchlight Procession
 Sacrament of Reconciliation
 Baths
 Outing to Quo gig
 Anointing of the Sick
 Hospitalite Service
 Children's Mass (led by the Glanfield group)
 Stations of the Cross
 Pilgrimage Photos
 Diocesan Events (Mass and sometimes a party)
 Passage through the Grotto
 Accueil Party (last night)
 Going Forth Mass (On the last morning of the Pilgrimage)

Health & Safety
Like all pilgrimages the CA has an extensive Health & Safety Policy.

Travel
The Catholic Association, for a number of years, has appointed Tangney Tours as their official travel agent, although a number of pilgrims travel independently. Most of the Pilgrimage travels from Stansted Airport, but many also travel by train from St Pancras and other airports like Manchester.

Accommodation
The Catholic Association tends to stay at hotels to the St Joseph Gate side of Lourdes. These include:

Hotel Beau Site

Hotel St Clair

Hotel Tara

Hotel Méditerranée

Hotel de la Grotte

Hotel Miramont

St Georges Hotel

Hotel Moderne

Notre Dame de France

Hotel St Sauveur

Solitude Hotel

Petit Languedoc

Hotel Irlande

Hotel Arcade

Hotel Alba

Hotel Christ Roi

Hotel Gallia Londres

Hotel Padoue

Hotel Eliseo

Note
The Catholic Association of the UK is not to be confused with that set up by Daniel O'Connell, founded in Ireland.

See also
Lourdes
Our Lady of Lourdes
Marian apparitions
Bernadette Soubirous

References

External links
 Catholic Association
 Catholic Encyclopedia 1901
 British Province of Carmelites

Catholic Church in the United Kingdom
Catholic Church in England and Wales
Hospitalités of Lourdes